Alexis Guérin (born 6 June 1992 in Libourne) is a French cyclist, who currently rides for UCI ProTeam .

Major results

2012
 1st Stage 2 Ronde de l'Isard Ariege
 2nd Time trial, National Under-23 Road Championships
2013
 1st Mountains classification Tour du Gévaudan Languedoc-Roussillon
 3rd Chrono des Nations U23
 4th Overall Kreiz Breizh Elites
 6th Time trial, UEC European Under-23 Road Championships
2014
 4th Overall Tour de Bretagne
 5th Overall Okolo Jižních Čech
2016
 1st Stage 1 Tour de Savoie Mont-Blanc
 7th Overall Kreiz Breizh Elites
2017
 4th Grand Prix des Marbriers
 8th Overall Kreiz Breizh Elites
1st Stage 3
 8th Paris–Chauny
2018
 5th Tour de Vendée
2019
 6th Overall CRO Race
 8th Memorial Marco Pantani
2020
 2nd Overall Tour de Savoie Mont-Blanc
 2nd Overall Giro della Friuli Venezia Giulia
 4th Overall International Tour of Rhodes
 7th Overall Tour de Hongrie
2021
 1st  Overall Oberösterreichrundfahrt
1st Stage 3
 4th Overall Tour de Savoie Mont-Blanc
1st Stage 4
 7th Overall Sibiu Cycling Tour
1st Stage 2
 10th Overall CRO Race
2022
 1st  Mountains classification, CRO Race
 1st Stage 4 Sazka Tour
 2nd Overall Tour of Bulgaria
1st  Mountains classification
 2nd Overall Oberösterreich Rundfahrt
 2nd Overall In the Steps of Romans
 3rd Overall South Aegean Tour
 3rd Overall International Tour of Rhodes

References

External links

1992 births
Living people
People from Libourne
French male cyclists
Sportspeople from Gironde
Cyclists from Nouvelle-Aquitaine
20th-century French people
21st-century French people